Full list of the genera in the family Rubiaceae. If the generic name is for an accepted genus, it will appear in bold italics followed by the author(s). If the name is a synonym, it will appear in italics followed by an equals sign (=) and the accepted name to which it is referred. Detailed, up to date information can be found on Plants of the World Online.

A 

Abbottia F.Muell. = Timonius Rumph. ex DC.
Abramsia Gillespie = Airosperma K.Schum. & Lauterb.
Acmostima Raf. = Pavetta L.
 Acranthera Arn. ex Meisn.
 Acrobotrys K.Schum. & K.Krause
Acrodryon Spreng. = Cephalanthus L.
Acrostoma Didr. = Remijia DC.
 Acrosynanthus Urb.
 Acunaeanthus Borhidi, Komlodi & Moncada
 Adenorandia Vermoesen
Adenosacme Wall. ex G.Gon = Mycetia Reinw.
Adenothola Lem. = Manettia Mutis ex L.
 Adina Salisb.
 Adinauclea Ridsdale = Adina Salisb.
 Adolphoduckea Paudyal & Delprete
Aeginetia Cav. = Bouvardia Salisb.
Aetheonema Rchb. = Gaertnera Lam.
 Afrocanthium (Bridson) Lantz & B.Bremer
Afrohamelia Wernham = Atractogyne Pierre
Afroknoxia Verdc. = Knoxia L.
 Agathisanthemum Klotzsch
 Agouticarpa C.H.Press.
Agylophora Neck. ex Raf. = Uncaria Schreb.
 Aidia Lour.
 Aidiopsis Tirveng.
 Airosperma K.Schum. & Lauterb.
Aitchisonia Hemsl. ex Aitch. = Plocama Aiton
 Alberta E.Mey.
 Aleisanthia Ridl.
 Aleisanthiopsis Tange
 Alibertia A.Rich ex DC.
Allaeophania Thwaites = Metabolos Blume
Alleizettea Dubard & Dop = Danais Comm. ex Vent.
 Alleizettella Pit.
Allenanthus Standl. = Machaonia Humb. & Bonpl.
 Alseis Schott
 Amaioua Aubl.
Amaracanthus Steud. = Amaracarpus Blume
 Amaracarpus Blume
Amaralia Welw. ex Hook.f. = Sherbournia G.Don
Ambraria Cruse = Nenax Gaertn.
Ambraria Heist. ex Fabr. = Anthospermum L.
Ammianthus Spruce ex Benth. & Hook.f. = Retiniphyllum Humb. & Bonpl.
 Amphiasma Bremek.
 Amphidasya Standl.
 Amphistemon Groeninckx
Anabata Willd. ex Roem. & Schult. = Faramea Aubl.
Ancylanthos Desf. = Vangueria Juss.
Andersonia Willd. ex Schult. = Gaertnera Lam.
Androtropis R.Br. ex Wall. = Acranthera Arn. ex Meisn.
Angusta J.Ellis = Gardenia J.Ellis
Anisomeris C.Presl = Chomelia Jacq.
Anistelma Raf. = Hedyotis L.
Anomanthodia Hook.f. = Aidia Lour.
Anonymos Walter = Houstonia L.
Anotis DC. = Arcytophyllum Willd. ex Schult. & Schult.f.
Antacanthus A.Rich. ex DC. = Scolosanthus Vahl
 Antherostele Bremek.
Antherura Lour. = Psychotria L.
Anthocephalus A.Rich. = Breonia A.Rich ex DC.
 Anthorrhiza C.R.Huxley & Jebb
 Anthospermopsis (K.Schum.) J.H.Kirkbr.
 Anthospermum L.
 Antirhea Comm. ex A.Juss.
Antirhoea DC. = Antirhea Comm. ex A.Juss.
Antirrhoea Comm. ex A.Juss. = Antirhea Comm. ex A.Juss.
 Antoniana Tussac = Faramea Aubl.
 Aoranthe Somers
Aparinanthus Fourr. = Galium L.
Aparine Guett. = Galium L.
Aparinella Fourr. = Galium L.
Aphaenandra Miq. = Mussaenda L.
 Aphanocarpus Steyerm.
Apomuria Bremek. = Psychotria L.
Appunettia R.D.Good = Morinda L.
 Appunia Hook.f.
Arachnimorpha Desv. ex Ham. = Rondeletia L.
 Arachnothryx Planch.
 Arariba Mart. = Simira Aubl.
Arbulocarpus Tennant = Spermacoce L.
 Arcytophyllum Willd. ex Schult. & Schult.f.
 Argocoffea (Pierre ex De Wild.) Lebrun = Argocoffeopsis Lebrun
 Argocoffeopsis Lebrun
 Argostemma Wall.
Argostemmella Ridl. = Argostemma Wall.
Ariadne Urb. = Mazaea Krug & Urb.
Asemanthia Ridl. = Mussaenda L.
Asemnantha Hook.f. = Chiococca P.Browne
Aspera Moench = Galium L.
× Asperugalium E.Fourn. = × Galiasperula Ronniger
 Asperula L.
 Aspidanthera Benth. = Ferdinandusa Pohl
 Assidora A.Chev. = Schumanniophyton Harms
Asterophyllum Schimp. & Spenn. = Asperula L.
 Astiella Jovet
 Atractocarpus Schltr. & K.Krause
 Atractogyne Pierre
 Aucubaephyllum Ahlb. = Psychotria L.
 Augusta Pohl
 Augustea DC. = Augusta Pohl
 Aulacocalyx Hook.f.
 Aulacodiscus  Hook.f. = Urophyllum Jack ex Wall.
 Axanthes Blume = Urophyllum Jack ex Wall.
 Axanthopsis Korth. = Urophyllum Jack ex Wall.
Axolus Raf. = Cephalanthus L.

B 

Baconia DC. = Pavetta L.
 Badusa A.Gray
Baldingera Dennst. = Psychotria L.
 Balfourina Kuntze = Didymaea Hook.f.
 Balmea Martinez
 Bamboga Baill. = Mitragyna Korth.
Bancalus  Rumph. ex Kuntze = Nauclea L.
Bartlingia Rchb. = Plocama Aiton
 Basanacantha Hook.f. = Randia L.
Bataprine Nieuwl. = Galium L.
 Bathysa C.Presl
Bathysograya Kuntze = Badusa A.Gray
 Batopedina Verdc.
Baumannia K.Schum. = Knoxia L.
Becheria Ridl. = Ixora L.
Belicea Lundell = Morinda L.
Belilla Adans. = Mussaenda L.
Bellardia Schreb. = Coccocypselum P.Browne
Bellermannia Klotzsch ex H.Karst. = Gonzalagunia Ruiz & Pav.
Bellizinca Borhidi = Deppea Schltdl. & Cham.
Bellynkxia Müll.Arg. = Morinda L.
 Belonophora Hook.f.
Bemsetia Raf. = Ixora L.
 Benkara Adans.
Benteca Adans. = Hymenodictyon Wall.
 Benzonia Schumach.
 Berghesia Nees
Bergkias Sonn. = Gardenia J.Ellis
 Berliera Buch.-Ham. ex Wall. = Myrioneuron R.Br. ex Hook.
 Bertiera Aubl.
Bigelovia Spreng. = Spermacoce L.
Bigelowia DC. = Spermacoce L.
 Bikkia Reinw. ex Blume
Bikkiopsis Brongn. & Gris = Bikkia Reinw. ex Blume
 Billardiera Vahl = Coussarea Aubl.
 Billiottia DC. = Melanopsidium Colla
Blandibractea Wernham = Simira Aubl.
 Blepharidium Standl.
Blepharostemma Ridl. = Asperula L.
Bobaea A.Rich. = Bobea Gaudich.
 Bobea Gaudich.
 Boholia Merr.
Bonatia Schltr. & K.Krause = Tarenna Gaertn.
 Bonifacia Silva Manso ex Steud. = Augusta Pohl
Borojoa Cuatrec. = Alibertia A.Rich ex DC.
Borreria G.Mey. = Spermacoce L.
 Bothriospora Hook.f.
 Botryarrhena Ducke
 Bouvardia Salisb.
 Brachytome Hook.f.
 Bradea Standl.
 Bremeria Razafim. & Alejandro
 Brenania Keay
 Breonadia Ridsdale
 Breonia A.Rich ex DC.
 Bridsonia Verstraete & A.E.van Wyk
Brignolia DC. = Isertia Schreb.
Bruinsmania Miq. = Isertia Schreb.
 Bruxanelia Dennst.
 Bubalina Raf. = Burchellia R.Br.
 Buchia Kunth = Perama Aubl.
 Buchozia L'Hér. ex Juss. = Serissa Comm. ex A.Juss.
Buena Cav. = Gonzalagunia Ruiz & Pav.
Buena Pohl = Cosmibuena Ruiz & Pav.
 Bullockia (Hiern) Razafim., Lantz & B.Bremer
Bunburya Meisn. ex Hochst. = Tricalysia A.Rich ex DC.
 Bungarimba K.M.Wong
Bunophila Willd. ex Roem. & Schult. = Machaonia Humb. & Bonpl.
 Bupleuroides Moench = Phyllis L.
 Burchellia R.Br.
Burneya Cham. & Schltdl. = Timonius Rumph. ex DC.
Burttdavya Hoyle = Nauclea L.
Buseria T.Durand = Coffea L.
 Buttneria P.Browne = Casasia A.Rich
 Byrsophyllum Hook.f.

C 

Cadamba Sonn. = Guettarda L.
Cafe Adans. = Coffea L.
Calanda K.Schum. = Pentanisia Harv.
 Calderonia Standl. = Simira Aubl.
Callicocca Schreb. = Psychotria L.
 Callipeltis Steven
 Calochone Keay
Calycodendron A.C.Sm. = Psychotria L.
 Calycophyllum DC.
 Calycosia A.Gray
 Calycosiphonia Pierre ex Robbr.
 Campanocalyx Valeton = Keenania Hook.f.
Camptophytum Pierre ex A.Chev. = Tarenna Gaertn.
Camptopus Hook.f. = Psychotria L.
Campylobotrys Lem. = Hoffmannia Sw.
 Canephora Juss.
Canthiopsis Seem. = Tarenna Gaertn.
Canthium Lam.
Canthiumera K.M.Wong & Mahyuni
Canthopsis Miq. = Catunaregam Wolf
 Capirona Spruce
 Caprosma G.Don = Coprosma J.R.Forst. & G.Forst.
Captaincookia N.Hallé = Ixora L.
Caquepiria J.F.Gmel. = Gardenia J.Ellis
Carajasia R.M. Salas, E.L. Cabral & Dessein
Carapichea Aubl.
Carinta W.Wight = Geophila D.Don
 Carmenocania Wernham = Pogonopus Klotzsch
 Carpacoce Sond.
 Carphalea Juss.
 Carterella Terrell
Caruelina Kuntze = Chomelia Jacq.
Caryococca Willd. ex Roem. & Schult. = Gonzalagunia Ruiz & Pav.
 Casasia A.Rich
Cascarilla (Endl.) Wedd. = Ladenbergia Klotzsch
Cassupa Humb. & Bonpl. = Isertia Schreb.
 Catesbaea L.
 Catunaregam Wolf
Cephaelis Sw. = Psychotria L.
 Cephalanthus L.
 Cephalidium A.Rich. = Breonia A.Rich ex DC.
Cephalina Thonn. = Nauclea L.
Cephalodendron Steyerm. = Remijia DC.
 Ceratites Sol. ex Miers = Rudgea Salisb.
 Ceratopyxis Hook.f.
 Ceriscoides (Hook.f.) Tirveng.
Ceriscus Gaertn. = Catunaregam Wolf
 Ceuthocarpus Aiello
Chaenocarpus Neck. ex A.Juss. = Spermacoce L.
 Chaetostachydium Airy Shaw
 Chaetostachys Valeton = Chaetostachydium Airy Shaw
 Chalazocarpus Hiern = Schumanniophyton Harms
 Chalepophyllum Hook.f.
 Chamaedaphne Mitch. = Mitchella L.
 Chamaepentas Bremek.
 Chamisme Nieuwl. = Houstonia L.
 Chapelieria A.Rich ex DC.
Charpentiera Vieill. = Ixora L.
 Chassalia Comm. ex Poir.
Chazaliella E.M.A.Petit & Verdc. = Eumachia DC.
Chenocarpus Neck. = Spermacoce L.
Chesnea Scop = Psychotria L.
 Chicoinaea Comm. ex DC. = Psychotria L.
 Chimarrhis Jacq.
 Chiococca P.Browne
 Chione DC.
Chlorochorion Puff & Robbr. = Pentanisia Harv.
Chlorostemma Ridl. = Galium L.
 Chomelia Jacq.
Chomelia L. = Tarenna Gaertn.
 Chondrococcus Steyerm. = Coccochondra Rauschert
Choristes Benth. = Deppea Schltdl. & Cham.
Choulettia Pomel = Plocama Aiton
Chrozorrhiza Ehrh. = Asperula L.
 Chrysoxylon Wedd. = Pogonopus Klotzsch
Chytropsia Bremek. = Margaritopsis Sauvalle
Cigarrilla Aiello = Nernstia Urb.
 Ciliosemina Antonelli
 Cinchona L.
 Cinchonopsis L.Andersson
 Cladoceras Bremek.
 Clarkella Hook.f.
 Clavenna Neck. ex Standl. = Lucya DC.
 Clavennaea Neck. ex Standl. = Lucya DC.
 Cleisocratera Korth. = Saprosma Blume
Clusiophyllea Baill. = Canthium Lam.
 Coccochondra Rauschert
 Coccocypselum P.Browne
Cococipsilum J.St.-Hill. = Coccocypselum P.Browne
Codaria Kuntze = Lerchea L.
 Coddia Verdc.
Coddingtonia S.Bowdich = Psychotria L.
Codonocalyx Miers ex Lindl. = Psychotria L.
 Coelopyrena Valeton
 Coelospermum Blume
Cofeanthus A.Chev. = Coffea L.
 Coffea L.
Coleactina N.Hallé = Leptactina Hook.f.
 Colladonia Spreng. = Palicourea Aubl.
Colleteria David W.Taylor = Wandersong David W.Taylor
 Colletoecema E.M.A.Petit
Commianthus Benth. = Retiniphyllum Humb. & Bonpl.
Commitheca Bremek. = Pauridiantha Hook.f.
Condalia Ruiz & Pav. = Coccocypselum P.Browne
 Condaminea DC.
 Congdonia Jebs. = Declieuxia Kunth
 Conosiphon Poepp. = Sphinctanthus Benth.
 Conostomium (Stapf) Cufod.
Conotrichia A.Rich = Manettia Mutis ex L.
 Coprosma J.R.Forst. & G.Forst.
 Coptophyllum Korth.
 Coptosapelta Korth.
 Coptosperma Hook.f.
 Cordia DC. = Guettarda L.
 Cordiera A.Rich. ex DC.
 Cordylostigma Groeninckx & Dessein
Cormigonus Raf. = Bikkia Reinw. ex Blume
Cormylus Raf. = Oldenlandia L.
 Corynanthe Welw.
 Corynula Hook.f. = Leptostigma Arn.
 Coryphothamnus Steyerm.
 Cosmibuena Ruiz & Pav.
 Cosmocalyx Standl.
Coupoui Aubl. = Duroia L.f.
Coursiana Homolle = Payera Baill.
 Coussarea Aubl.
 Coutaportla Urb.
 Coutarea Aubl.
 Coutareopsis Paudyal & Delprete
Covolia Nick. = Spermacoce L.
 Cowiea Wernham
 Craterispermum Benth.
 Creaghia Scort. = Mussaendopsis Baill.
Creatantha Standl. = Isertia Schreb.
 Cremaspora Benth.
Cremocarpon Boivin ex Baill. = Psychotria L.
Crinita Houtt. = Pavetta L.
 Crobylanthe Bremek.
Crocyllis E.Mey. ex Hook.f. = Plocama Aiton
 Crossopteryx Fenzl
 Crucianella L.
 Cruciata Mill.
 Cruckshanksia Hook. & Arn.
Crusea A.Rich. = Chione DC.
 Crusea Schltdl. & Cham.
 Cryptospermum Young = Opercularia Gaertn.
 Csapodya Borhidi = Deppea Schltdl. & Cham.
Cuatrecasasiodendron Steyerm. = Arachnothryx Planch.
 Cubanola Aiello
 Cucullaria Kuntze = Callipeltis Steven
Cuncea Buch.-Ham. ex D.Don = Knoxia L.
 Cunina Clos = Nertera Banks ex Sol.
Cunninghamia Schreb. = Malanea Aubl.
Cupi Adans. = Tarenna Gaertn.
Cupia (Schult.) DC. = Aidia Lour.
 Cupirana Miers = Duroia L.f.
 Cupuia Raf. = Duroia L.f.
Cutaria Brign. = Coutarea Aubl.
 Cuviera DC.
 Cyanoneuron Tange
 Cyclophyllum Hook.f.
 Cymelonema C.Presl = Urophyllum Jack ex Wall.
Cynanchica Fourr. = Asperula L.
Cynocrambe Gagnebin = Theligonum L.
 Cyrtanthus Schreb. = Posoqueria Aubl.

D 

 Damnacanthus C.F.Gaertn.
 Danais Comm. ex Vent.
 Darluca Raf. = Faramea Aubl.
Dasus Lour. = Lasianthus Jack
Dasycephala (DC.) Hook.f. = Spermacoce L.
Daun-Contu Adans. = Paederia L.
Debia Neupane & N.Wikstr.
Decameria Welw. = Gardenia J.Ellis
Decapenta Raf. = Diodia L.
 Deccania Tirveng.
 Declieuxia Kunth
Delpechia Montrouz. = Psychotria L.
 Democritea DC. = Serissa Comm. ex A.Juss.
 Dendrosipanea Ducke
 Denscantia E.L.Cabral
 Dentella J.R.Forst. & G.Forst.
Dentillaria Kuntze = Knoxia L.
 Deppea Schltdl. & Cham.
Deppeopsis Borhidi & Strancz = Deppea Schltdl. & Cham.
 Diacrodon Sprague
 Diadorimia  J.A.M.Carmo, Florentín & R.M.Salas
 Dialypetalanthus Kuhlm.
 Dibrachionostylus Bremek.
 Dibridsonia K.M.Wong
 Dichilanthe Thwaites
Dichrospermum Bremek. = Spermacoce L.
Dicrobotryum Willd. ex Schult. = Guettarda L.
Dictyandra Welw. ex Hook.f. = Leptactina Hook.f.
 Didymaea Hook.f.
 Didymochlamys Hook.f.
Didymoecium Bremek. = Rennellia Korth.
 Didymopogon Bremek.
 Didymosalpinx Keay
 Dillenia Heist. ex Fabr. = Sherardia L.
Dimetia Meisn.
Dinocanthium Bremek. = Pyrostria Comm. ex A.Juss.
Diodella Small = Hexasepalum Bartl. ex DC.
 Diodia L.
Diodioides Loefl. = Spermacoce L.
 Dioecrescis Tirveng.
 Dioicodendron Steyerm.
Dioneiodon Raf. = Diodia L.
Diotocarpus Hochst. = Pentanisia Harv.
Diotocranus Bremek. = Mitrasacmopsis Jovet
 Diphragmus C.Presl = Tessiera Miq.
 Diplocrater Hook.f. = Tricalysia A.Rich ex DC.
Diplophragma (Wight & Arn.) Meisn. = Hedyotis L.
 Diplospora DC.
Diplosporopsis Wernham = Belonophora Hook.f.
 Dirichletia Klotzsch
Discocoffea A.Chev. = Tricalysia A.Rich ex DC.
 Discospermum Dalzell
Disodea Pers. = Paederia L.
 Disperma J.F.Gmel. = Mitchella L.
 Ditrichanthus Borhidi, E.Martínez & Ramos
 Diyaminauclea Ridsdale
 Dolianthus C.H.Wright
 Dolichanthera Schltr. & K.Krause = Thiollierea Montrouz.
 Dolichocarpa K.L.Gibbons
 Dolichodelphys K.Schum. & K.Krause
 Dolicholobium A.Gray
 Dolichometra K.Schum.
 Dolichopentas Kårehed & B.Bremer
Dondisia DC. = Canthium Lam.
Donkelaaria Lem. = Guettarda L.
 Donnellyanthus Borhidi
Doricera Verdc. = Ixora L.
 Dorisia Gillespie = Mastixiodendron Melch.
Dorothea Wernham = Aulacocalyx Hook.f.
Douarrea Montrouz. = Psychotria L.
Dressleriopsis Dwyer = Lasianthus Jack
Duggena Vahl ex Standl. = Gonzalagunia Ruiz & Pav.
Duhamelia Pers. = Hamelia Jacq.
 Duidania Standl.
 Dukea Dwyer = Raritebe Wernham
 Dunalia Spreng. = Lucya DC.
 Dunnia Tutcher
 Duperrea Pierre ex Pit.
 Duroia L.f.
 Durringtonia R.J.F.Hend. & Guymer
Duvaucellia Bowdich = Kohautia Cham. & Schltdl.
Dychotria Raf. = Psychotria L.
Dyctiospora Reinw. ex Korth. = Oldenlandia L.
 Dysoda Lour. = Serissa Comm. ex A.Juss.
 Dysodidendron Gardner = Saprosma Blume
 Dysosmia M.Roem. = Saprosma Blume

E 

Ebelia Rchb. = Diodia L.
Echinodendrum A.Rich. = Scolosanthus Vahl
Ecpoma K.Schum. = Sabicea Aubl.
Edechia Loefl. = Guettarda L.
Edithea Standl. = Deppea Schltdl. & Cham.
Edrastenia Raf. = Oldenlandia L.
 Edrastigma (L.) Raf. = Oldenlandia L.
Edrastima Raf.
Ehrenbergia Spreng. = Amaioua Aubl.
Einsteinia Ducke = Kutchubaea Fisch. ex DC.
Eionitis Bremek. = Oldenlandia L.
 Eizia Standl.
 Elaeagia Wedd.
 Elattospermum Soler. = Breonia A.Rich ex DC.
 Eleuthranthes F.Muell. ex Benth.
 Emmenopterys Oliv.
 Emmeorhiza Pohl ex Endl.
 Empogona Hook.f.
 Encopea C.Presl = Faramea Aubl.
 Endlichera C.Presl = Emmeorhiza Pohl ex Endl.
 Endolasia Turcz. = Manettia Mutis ex L.
Endopogon Raf. = Diodella Small
 Enkylista Benth. & Hook.f. = Calycophyllum DC.
Enterospermum Hiern = Coptosperma Hook.f.
 Eosanthe Urb.
 Epidendroides Sol. = Myrmecodia Jack
Epitaberna K.Schum. = Heinsia DC.
 Epithinia Jack = Scyphiphora C.F.Gaertn.
 Eranthemum Spreng. = Scolosanthus Vahl
 Ereicoctis (DC.) Kuntze = Arcytophyllum Willd. ex Schult. & Schult.f.
Eresimus Raf. = Cephalanthus L.
 Eriosemopsis Robyns
Eriostoma Boivin ex Baill. = Tricalysia A.Rich ex DC.
 Erithalis P.Browne
Ernestimeyera Kuntze = Alberta E.Mey.
 Ernodea Sw.
 Erythrodanum Thouars = Nertera Banks ex Sol.
 Etericius Desv. ex Ham.
 Euclinia Salisb.
Eukylista Benth. = Calycophyllum DC.
Eumachia DC.
Eumorphanthus A.C.Sm. = Psychotria L.
Euosmia Humb. & Bonpl. = Hoffmannia Sw.
Eupyrena Wight & Arn. = Timonius Rumph. ex DC.
Eurhotia Neck. = Psychotria L.
Eurynome DC. = Coprosma J.R.Forst. & G.Forst.
Evea Aubl. = Faramea Aubl.
Everistia (F.Muell.) S.T.Reynolds & R.J.F.Hend.
Evosmia Kunth = Hoffmannia Sw.
Exallage Bremek.
Exallosperma De Block
Exandra Standl. = Simira Aubl.
Exechostylus K.Schum. = Pavetta L.
Exosolenia Baill. ex Drake = Lemyrea (A.Chev.) A.Chev. & Beille
 Exostema (Pers.) Rich. ex Humb. & Bonpl.
Eyselia Neck. = Galium L.

F 

 Fadogia Schweinf.
 Fadogiella Robyns
Fagerlindia Tirveng. = Benkara Adans.
 Faramea Aubl.
 Ferdinandea Pohl = Ferdinandusa Pohl
 Ferdinandusa Pohl
Fereiria Vell. ex Vand. = Hillia Jacq.
 Feretia Delile
 Fergusonia Hook.f.
 Fernelia Comm. ex Lam.
 Figuierea Montrouz. = Coelospermum Blume
 Flagenium Baill.
Flemingia Hunter ex Ridl. = Tarenna Gaertn.
Fleroya Y.F.Deng = Mitragyna Korth.
 Flexanthera Rusby
 Foonchewia R.J.Wang & H.Z.Wen
 Fosbergia Tirveng. & Sastre
 Foscarenia Vell. ex Vand. = Randia L.
 Franchetia Baill. = Breonia A.Rich ex DC.
Franciella Guillaumin = Atractocarpus Schltr. & K.Krause
 Froelichia Vahl = Coussarea Aubl.
Fructesca DC. ex Meisn. = Gaertnera Lam.
Fuchsia Sw. = Schradera Vahl
Furcatella Baum.-Bod. = Psychotria L.

G 

 Gaertnera Lam.
Gaillonia A.Rich. ex DC. = Plocama Aiton
 Galianthe Griseb.
 × Galiasperula Ronniger
 Galiniera Delile
Galion St.-Lag. = Galium L.
Galiopsis St.-Lag. = Asperula L.
 Galium L.
 Gallienia Dubard & Dop
Gallion Pohl = Galium L.
Gallium Mill. = Galium L.
 Galopina Thunb.
Galvania Vand. = Psychotria L.
Gamotopea Bremek. = Psychotria L.
 Ganguelia Robbr.
Garapatica H.Karst. = Alibertia A.Rich ex DC.
 Gardenia J.Ellis
Gardeniola Cham. = Alibertia A.Rich ex DC.
 Gardeniopsis Miq.
 Genipa L.
Genipella Rich. ex DC. = Alibertia A.Rich ex DC.
 Gentingia J.T.Johanss. & K.M.Wong
Geocardia Standl. = Geophila D.Don
 Geoherpum Willd. ex Schult. = Mitchella L.
 Geophila D.Don
Gerontogea Cham. & Schltdl. = Oldenlandia L.
Gilipus Raf. = Cephalanthus L.
 Gillespiea A.C.Sm.
 Gleasonia Standl.
 Glionnetia Tirveng.
 Globulostylis Wernham
 Gloneria André = Rudgea Salisb.
 Glossostipula Lorence
 Gomozia Mutis ex L.f. = Nertera Banks ex Sol.
 Gomphocalyx Baker
 Gomphosia Wedd. = Ferdinandusa Pohl
Gonianthes Rich. = Cubanola Aiello
Gonotheca Blume ex DC. = Oldenlandia L.
Gonyanera Korth. = Acranthera Arn. ex Meisn.
 Gonzalagunia Ruiz & Pav.
Gonzalea Pers. = Gonzalagunia Ruiz & Pav.
Gouldia A.Gray = Kadua Cham. & Schltdl.
 Greenea Wight & Arn.
 Greeniopsis Merr.
 Griffithia Wight & Arn. = Benkara Adans.
 Grisia Brongn. = Thiollierea Montrouz.
Gruhlmania Neck. = Spermacoce L.
Grumilea Gaertn. = Psychotria L.
 Guagnebina Vell. = Manettia Mutis ex L.
 Guettarda L.
 Guettardella Champ. ex Benth.
 Guihaiothamnus H.S.Lo
Guttenbergia Zoll. & Moritzi = Gynochthodes Blume
 Gynochthodes Blume
Gynopachis Blume = Aidia Lour.
 Gyrostipula J.-F.Leroy

H 

 Habroneuron Standl.
Haldina Ridsdale = Adina Salisb.
Halesia P.Browne = Guettarda L.
Hallea J.-F.Leroy = Fleroya Y.F.Deng
 Hamelia Jacq.
 Hamiltonia Roxb. = Spermadictyon Roxb.
Hayataella Masam. = Ophiorrhiza L.
 Hedstromia A.C.Sm.
 Hedyotis L.
 Hedythyrsus Bremek.
 Heinsenia K.Schum.
 Heinsia DC.
 Hekistocarpa Hook.f.
 Helictosperma De Block
Helospora Jacq. = Timonius Rumph. ex DC.
Hemidiodia K.Schum. = Spermacoce L.
Henlea H.Karst. = Rustia Klotzsch
 Henriquezia Spruce ex Benth.
Herrera Adans. = Erithalis P.Browne
 Heterophyllaea Hook.f.
Hexactina Willd. ex Schult. & Schult.f. = Amaioua Aubl.
Hexasepalum Bartl. ex DC.
Hexepta Raf. = Coffea L.
 Hexodontocarpus Dulac = Sherardia L.
 Heymia Dennst. = Dentella J.R.Forst. & G.Forst.
Higginsia Blume = Hypobathrum Blume
Higginsia Pers. = Hoffmannia Sw.
 Hillia Jacq.
 Himalrandia T.Yamaz.
 Hindsia Benth. ex Lindl.
 Hintonia Bullock
 Hippotis Ruiz & Pav.
Hitoa Nadeaud = Ixora L.
 Hodgkinsonia F.Muell.
 Hoffmannia Sw.
Holocarpa Baker = Pentanisia Harv.
 Holostyla Endl. = Coelospermum Blume
 Holostylis Rchb. = Coelospermum Blume
 Holstianthus Steyerm.
 Holtonia Standl. = Simira Aubl.
 Homaloclados Hook.f. = Faramea Aubl.
 Homollea Arènes
 Homolliella Arènes = Paracephaelis 
Hondbesseion Kuntze = Paederia L.
Hondbessen Adans. = Paederia L.
 Houstonia L.
 Howardia Klotzsch = Pogonopus Klotzsch
 Hutchinsonia Robyns
 Hydnophytum Jack
 Hydrophylax L.f.
Hylacium P.Beauv. = Psychotria L.
 Hymendocarpum Pierre ex Pit. = Nostolachma T.Durand
Hymenocnemis Hook.f. = Gaertnera Lam.
 Hymenocoleus Robbr.
 Hymenodictyon Wall.
 Hymenopogon Wall. = Neohymenopogon Bennet
 Hyperacanthus E.Mey. ex Bridson
 Hypobathrum Blume
Hypodematium A.Rich. = Spermacoce L.
 Hyptianthera Wight & Arn.

I 

Ibetralia Bremek. = Kutchubaea Fisch. ex DC.
Imantina Hook.f. = Gynochthodes Blume
Indopolysolenia Bennet = Leptomischus Drake
Involucrella (Benth. & Hook.f.) Neupane & N.Wikstr.
Ipecacuanha Arruda = Psychotria L.
 Isertia Schreb.
 Isidorea A.Rich ex DC.
 Ixora L.

J 

 Jackia Wall. = Jackiopsis Ridsdale
 Jackiopsis Ridsdale
 Jainia N.P.Balakr. = Coptophyllum Korth.
 Jamaicanthus Borhidi
 Janotia J.-F.Leroy
Jaubertia Guill. = Plocama Aiton
Javorkaea Borhidi & Jarai-Koml. = Arachnothryx Planch.
 Joosia H.Karst.
 Jovetia Guédès
Jurgensia Raf. = Spermacoce L.
Justenia Hiern = Bertiera Aubl.

K 

 Kadua Cham. & Schltdl.
 Kailarsenia Tirveng.
 Kajewskiella Merr. & L.M.Perry
 Kanapia Arriola & Alejandro
Karamyschewia Fisch. & C.A.Mey. = Oldenlandia L.
Katoutheka Adans. = Wendlandia Bartl. ex DC.
Keenania Hook.f. = Ophiorrhiza L.
 Keetia E.Phillips
 Kelloggia Torr. ex Benth. & Hook.f.
 Kerianthera J.H.Kirkbr.
Kerstingia K.Schum. = Belonophora Hook.f.
 Khasiaclunea Ridsdale
 Kindia Cheek
Kinkina Adans. = Cinchona L.
 Klossia Ridl.
 Knoxia L.
 Kochummenia K.M.Wong
Koehneago Kuntze = Hoffmannia Sw.
 Kohautia Cham. & Schltdl.
Kotchubaea Regel ex Benth. & Hook.f. = Kutchubaea Fisch. ex DC.
 Kraussia Harv.
 Kupeantha Cheek
Kurria Hochst. & Steud. = Hymenodictyon Wall.
 Kutchubaea Fisch. ex DC.
 Kyrtanthus J.F.Gmel. = Posoqueria Aubl.

L 

 Lachnastoma Korth. = Nostolachma T.Durand
Lachnosiphonium Hochst. = Catunaregam Wolf
 Ladenbergia Klotzsch
 Lagotis E.Mey. = Carpacoce Sond.
Lagynias E.Mey. ex Robyns = Vangueria Juss.
 Lamprothamnus Hiern
Landia Comm. ex DC. = Bremeria Razafim. & Alejandro
 Landiopsis Capuron ex Bosser
 Larsenaikia Tirveng.
 Lasianthus Jack
 Lasionema D.Don = Macrocnemum P.Browne
 Lasiostoma Benth. = Hydnophytum Jack
 Lathraeocarpa Bremek.
Laugeria L. = Guettarda L.
Laugeria Vahl ex Hook.f. = Stenostomum C.F.Gaertn.
Laugieria Jacq. = Guettarda L.
Lawia Wight = Mycetia Reinw.
 Laxmannia S.G.Gmel. ex Trin. = Phuopsis (Griseb.) Hook.f.
 Lecananthus Jack
Lecanosperma Rusby = Heterophyllaea Hook.f.
 Lecariocalyx Bremek.
Lecontea A.Rich. ex DC. = Paederia L.
Leiochilus Hook.f. = Coffea L.
 Lelya Bremek.
Lemairea de Vriese = Mycetia Reinw.
 Lemyrea (A.Chev.) A.Chev. & Beille
 Lepidostoma Bremek.
Lepipogon G.Bertol. = Catunaregam Wolf
 Leptactina Hook.f.
 Leptodermis Wall.
 Leptomischus Drake
 Leptopetalum Hook. & Arn.
 Leptoscela Hook.f.
 Leptostigma Arn.
Leptunis Steven = Asperula L.
 Lerchea L.
Leroyia Cavaco = Pyrostria Comm. ex A.Juss.
 Leucocodon Gardner
 Leucolophus Bremek.
Lightfootia Schreb. = Rondeletia L.
 Limnosipanea Hook.f.
Lindenia Benth. = Augusta Pohl
 Lintersemina  Humberto Mend., Celis & M.A.González
Lipostoma D.Don = Coccocypselum P.Browne
 Lippaya Endl. = Dentella J.R.Forst. & G.Forst.
Listeria Neck. = Oldenlandia L.
Litosanthes Blume = Lasianthus Jack
Lonicera Adans. = Hamelia Jacq.
Loranthus guadalupensis DC. = Notopleura parasitica ( (Sw.) Hammel
Lorencea Borhidi = Coutaportla Urb.
 Loretoa Standl. = Capirona Spruce
Lucinaea DC. = Schradera Vahl
 Luculia Sweet
 Lucya DC.
 Ludekia Ridsdale
Lycioserissa Roem. & Schult. = Canthium Lam.
 Lygistum P.Browne = Manettia Mutis ex L.
Lygodisodea Ruiz & Pav. = Paederia L.

M 

Macbrideina Standl.
Machaonia Humb. & Bonpl.
Macrandria (Wight & Arn.) Meisn. = Hedyotis L.
Macrocalyx Miers ex Lindl. = Psychotria L.
Macrocnemum P.Browne
Macrocneumum Vand. = Remijia DC.
Macrosiphon Miq. = Hindsia Benth. ex Lindl.
Macrosphyra Hook.f.
Maguireocharis Steyerm.
Maguireothamnus Steyerm.
Malanea Aubl.
Mallostoma H.Karst. = Arcytophyllum Willd. ex Schult. & Schult.f.
Mamboga Blanco = Mitragyna Korth.
Manettia Mutis ex L.
Manostachya Bremek.
Mantalania Capuron ex J.-F.Leroy
Mapouria Aubl. = Psychotria L.
Mappia Hablitz ex Ledeb. = Crucianella L.
Margaris Griseb. = Eumachia DC.
Margaritopsis Sauvalle = Eumachia DC.
Marquisia A.Rich. ex DC. = Coprosma J.R.Forst. & G.Forst.
Martensianthus Borhidi & Lozada-Pérez
Martha F.J.Müll. = Posoqueria Aubl.
Maschalanthe Blume = Urophyllum Jack ex Wall.
Maschalocorymbus Bremek. = Urophyllum Jack ex Wall.
Maschalodesme K.Schum. & Lauterb.
Massularia (K.Schum.) Hoyle
Mastixiodendron Melch.
Matthiola L. = Guettarda L.
Mattuschkaea Schreb. = Perama Aubl.
Mattuschkea Batsch = Perama Aubl.
Mazaea Krug & Urb.
Megacarpha Hochst. = Oxyanthus DC.
Megalopus K.Schum. = Psychotria L.
Megaphyllum Spruce ex Baill. = Pentagonia Benth.
Meionandra Gauba = Valantia L.
Melachone Gilli = Amaracarpus Blume
Melanopsidium Colla
Melanoxerus Kainul. & B.Bremer
Menestoria DC. = Mussaenda L.
Mephitidia Reinw. ex Blume = Lasianthus Jack
Mericarpaea Boiss.
Mericocalyx Bamps = Otiophora Zucc.
Merismostigma S.Moore = Coelospermum Blume
Merumea Steyerm.
Mesoptera Hook.f. = Psydrax Gaertn.
Metabolos Blume = Hedyotis L.
Metabolus A.Rich. = Hedyotis L.
Metadina Bakh.f. = Adina Salisb.
Mexocarpus Borhidi, E.Martínez & Ramos = Palicourea Aubl.
Mexotis Terrell & H.Rob.
Meyna Roxb. ex Link
Micrasepalum Urb.
Microlicea holosericea Naudin = 'Perama holosericea (Naudin) Wurdack & Steyerm.Microphysa SchrenkMicrosplenium Hook.f. = Machaonia Humb. & Bonpl.Mitchella L.Mitracarpus Zucc. ex Schult. & Schult.f.Mitragyna Korth.Mitrasacmopsis JovetMitrastigma Harv. = Psydrax Gaertn.Mitratheca K.Schum. = Oldenlandia L.Mitreola Boehm. = Ophiorrhiza L.Mitriostigma Hochst.Molopanthera Turcz.Monadelphanthus H.Karst. = Capirona SpruceMonosalpinx N.HalléMontamans Dwyer = Notopleura (Hook.f.) Bremek.Morelia A.Rich ex DC.Morierina Vieill. = Thiollierea Montrouz.Morinda L.Morindopsis Hook.f.Motleyia J.T.Johanss.Motleyothamnus Paudyal & DelpreteMouretia Pit.Multidentia GilliMungos Adans. = Ophiorrhiza L.Mussaenda L.Mussaendopsis Baill.Mycetia Reinw.Myonima Comm. ex A.Juss. = Ixora L.Myrioneuron R.Br. ex Hook. = Mycetia Reinw.Myrmecodia JackMyrmeconauclea Merr.Myrmedoma Becc. = Myrmephytum Becc.Myrmephytum Becc.Myrstiphylla Ridl. = Psychotria L.Myrstiphyllum P.Browne = Psychotria L.

 N 

 Nacibea Aubl. = Manettia Mutis ex L.Naletonia Bremek. = Psychotria L.Narega Raf. = Catunaregam Wolf
 Nargedia Bedd.Natalanthe Sond. = Tricalysia A.Rich ex DC.
 Nauclea L.
 Neanotis W.H.Lewis
 Neblinathamnus Steyerm.
 Neleixa Raf. = Faramea Aubl.
 Nematostylis Hook.f.
 Nemostylis Steven = Phuopsis (Griseb.) Hook.f.
 Nenax Gaertn.Neobaumannia Hutch. & Dalziel = Knoxia L.
 Neobertiera Wernham
 Neoblakea Standl.Neobreonia Ridsdale = Breonia A.Rich ex DC.Neofranciella Guillaumin = Atractocarpus Schltr. & K.KrauseNeogaillonia Lincz. = Plocama Aiton
 Neohymenopogon Bennet
 Neolamarckia BosserNeolaugeria Nicolson = Stenostomum C.F.Gaertn.Neoleroya Cavaco = Pyrostria Comm. ex A.Juss.
 Neomartensia Borhidi & Lozada-Pérez = Martensianthus Borhidi & Lozada-PérezNeomazaea Urb. = Mazaea Krug & Urb.
 Neomussaenda Tange
 Neonauclea Merr.Neopentanisia Verdc. = Pentanisia Harv.Neorosea N.Hallé = Tricalysia A.Rich ex DC.
 Neosabicea Wernham = Manettia Mutis ex L.Neoschimpera Hemsl. = Amaracarpus Blume
 Nernstia Urb.
 Nertera Banks ex Sol.Nescidia A.Rich. ex DC. = Coffea L.
 Nesohedyotis (Hook.f.) Bremek.Nettlera Ridl. = Carapichea Aubl.
 Neurocalyx Hook.Neurocarpaea R.Br. = Pentas Benth.
 Nichallea Bridson
 Nobula Adans. = Phyllis L.
 Nodocarpaea A.GrayNonatelia Aubl. = Palicourea Aubl.
 Normandia Hook.f.
 Nostolachma T.DurandNothocarpus Post & Kuntze = Nodocarpaea A.GrayNothophlebia Standl. = Pentagonia Benth.Notodontia Pierre ex Pit. = Lerchea L.
 Notopleura (Hook.f.) Bremek.

 O Obbea Hook.f. = Bobea Gaudich.
 Ochreinauclea Ridsdale & Bakh.f.Octavia DC. = Lasianthus JackOctodon Thonn. = Spermacoce L.
 Octotropis Bedd.Ohigginsia Ruiz & Pav. = Hoffmannia Sw.
 Oldenlandia L.
 Oldenlandiopsis Terrell & W.H.Lewis
 Oligocodon Keay
 Olostyla DC. = Coelospermum Blume
 Omiltemia Standl.
 Opercularia Gaertn.
 Ophiorrhiza L.Ophryococcus Oerst. = Hoffmannia Sw.Oregandra Standl. = Chione DC.
 Oreopolus Schltdl.
 Oribasia Schreb. = Palicourea Aubl.Orthostemma Wall. ex Voigt = Pentas Benth.
 Osa Aiello
 Otiophora Zucc.Otocalyx Brandegee = Arachnothryx Planch.Otocephalus Chiov. = Pentanisia Harv.
 Otomeria Benth.
 Ottoschmidtia Urb.Ourouparia Aubl. = Uncaria Schreb.
 Oxyanthus DC.
 Oxyceros Lour.
 Oxyspermum Eckl. & Zeyh. = Galopina Thunb.

 P 

 Pachysanthus C.Presl = Rudgea Salisb.Pachystigma Hochst. = Vangueria Juss.
 Pachystylus K.Schum.
 Paederia L.
 Paedicalyx Pierre ex Pit. = Xanthophytum Reinw. ex Blume
 Pagamea Aubl.
 Pagameopsis Steyerm.
 Paganuccia R.M.SalasPaiva Vell. = Sabicea Aubl.
 Palicourea Aubl.Pallasia Klotzsch = Wittmackanthus KuntzePamplethantha Bremek. = Pauridiantha Hook.f.Panchezia Montrouz. = Ixora L.
 Panetos Raf. = Houstonia L.Paolia Chiov. = Coffea L.Pappostylum Pierre = Cremaspora Benth.
 Paracarphalea Razafimandimbison, Ferm, B.Bremer & Kårehed
 Paracephaelis Baill.
 Parachimarrhis DuckeParacoffea J.-F.Leroy = Coffea L.
 Paracorynanthe Capuron
 Paradina Pierre ex Pit. = Mitragyna Korth.
 Paragenipa Baill.Paragophyton K.Schum. = Spermacoce L.
 Paraknoxia Bremek.
 Paralasianthus H.Zhu
 Paranotis Pedley ex K.L.Gibbons
 Parapentas Bremek.Paratriaina Bremek. = Triainolepis Hook.f.
 Paravinia Hassk. = Praravinia Korth.Patabea Aubl. = Ixora L.
 Patima Aubl.Patsjotti Adans. = Strumpfia Jacq.
 Pauridiantha Hook.f.Pavate Adans. = Pavetta L.
 Pavetta L.
 Payera Baill.
 Pecheya Scop. = Coussarea Aubl.
 Peckeya Raf. = Coussarea Aubl.Pelagodendron Seem. = Aidia Lour.
 Pelaphia Banks & Sol. ex A.Cunn. = Coprosma J.R.Forst. & G.Forst.
 Pelaphoides rotundiflora Banks & Sol. ex Cheeseman = Coprosma spathulata A.Cunn subsp. spathulata Peltospermum Benth. = Sacosperma G.TaylorPentacarpaea Hiern = Pentanisia Harv.Pentacarpus Post & Kuntze = Pentanisia Harv.
 Pentagonia Benth.
 Pentaloncha Hook.f.
 Pentanisia Harv.
 Pentanopsis Rendle
 Pentas Benth.
 Pentodon Hochst.
 Peponidium (Baill.) Arènes
 Perakanthus Robyns
 Perama Aubl.Peratanthe Urb. = Nertera Banks ex Sol.
 Perdicesca Prov. = Mitchella L.
 Perdicesea repens (L.) Prov. = Mitchella repens L.
 Peripeplus PierrePertusadina Ridsdale = Adina Salisb.Petagomoa Bremek. = Psychotria L.Petesia P.Browne = Rondeletia L.
 Petitiocodon Robbr.
 Petunga DC. = Hypobathrum BlumePhallaria Schumach. & Thonn. = Psydrax Gaertn.
 Phellocalyx Bridson
 Phialanthus Griseb.
 Phialiphora Groeninckx
 Phitopis Hook.f.Phosanthus Raf. = Isertia Schreb.
 Phuopsis (Griseb.) Hook.f.
 Phylanthera Noronha = Hypobathrum BlumePhyllacanthus Hook.f. = Catesbaea L.
 Phyllis L.
 Phyllocrater Wernham
 Phyllomelia Griseb.
 Phyllopentas (Verdc.) Kårehed & B.Bremer
 Phylohydrax PuffPhyteumoides Smeathman ex DC. = Virectaria Bremek.
 Picardaea Urb.
 Pimentelia Wedd.
 Pinarophyllon Brandegee
 Pinckneya Michx.
 Pinknea Pers. = Pinckneya Michx.Piringa Juss. = Gardenia J.Ellis
 Pitardella Tirveng.Pittierothamnus Steyerm. = Amphidasya Standl.
 Pittoniotis Griseb.
 Placocarpa Hook.f.
 Placodium Hook.f. = Plocama AitonPlacopoda Balf.f. = Dirichletia Klotzsch
 Planaltina R.M.Salas & E.L.Cabral
 Plastolaena Pierre ex A.Chev. = Schumanniophyton HarmsPlatanocarpum Korth. = Nauclea L.Platanocephalus Vaill. ex Crantz = Nauclea L.
 Platycarpum Humb. & Bonpl.
 Platymerium Bartl. ex DC. = Hypobathrum BlumePlectronia L. = different genera
 Plectroniella RobynsPleimeris Raf. = Gardenia J.EllisPleiocarpidia K.Schum. = Urophyllum Jack ex Wall.
 Pleiocoryne RauschertPleiocraterium Bremek. = Hedyotis L.
 Pleotheca Wall. = Ophiorrhiza L.Plethyrsis Raf. = Richardia L.Pleureia Raf. = Psychotria L.
 Pleurocarpus Klotzsch = Melanopsidium CollaPleurocoffea Baill. = Coffea L.
 Plocama Aiton
 Plocaniophyllon BrandegeePoecilocalyx Bremek. = Pauridiantha Hook.f.
 Poederiopsis Rusby = Manettia Mutis ex L.Pogonanthus Montrouz. = Gynochthodes Blume
 Pogonolobus F.Muell. = Coelospermum Blume
 Pogonopus Klotzsch
 Poiretia J.F.Gmel. = Houstonia L.
 Polycoryne Keay = Pleiocoryne Rauschert
 Polycycliska Ridl. = Lerchea L.Polyozus Lour. = Psychotria L.Polyphragmon Desf. = Timonius Rumph. ex DC.
 Polysolen Rauschert = Leptomischus Drake
 Polysolenia Hook.f. = Leptomischus Drake
 Polysphaeria Hook.f.
 Polyura Hook.f.Pomangium Reinw. = Argostemma Wall.Pomatium C.F.Gaertn. = Bertiera Aubl.
 Pomax Sol. ex DC.
 Pomazota Ridl. = Coptophyllum Korth.Porocarpus Gaertn. = Timonius Rumph. ex DC.
 Porterandia Ridl.
 Portlandia P.Browne
 Posoqueria Aubl.
 Posoria Raf. = Posoqueria Aubl.
 Potima R.Hedw. = Faramea Aubl.
 Pouchetia A.Rich ex DC.
 Praravinia Korth.
 Pravinaria Bremek. = Urophyllum Jack ex Wall.
 Preussiodora KeayPrincea Dubard & Dop = Triainolepis Hook.f.
 Prismatomeris ThwaitesPristidia Thwaites = Gaertnera Lam.Probletostemon K.Schum. = Tricalysia A.Rich ex DC.Proscephaleium Korth. = Chassalia Comm. ex Poir.Psathura Comm. ex A.Juss. = Psychotria L.
 Pseudaidia Tirveng.Pseudixora Miq. = Aidia Lour.
 Pseudochimarrhis Ducke = Chimarrhis Jacq.Pseudocinchona A.Chev. ex Perrot = Corynanthe Welw.
 Pseudocoptosperma De Block
 Pseudodiplospora Dep
 Pseudogalium L.E.Yang, Z.L.Nie & H.SunPseudogaillonia Linchevskii = Plocama AitonPseudogardenia Keay = Adenorandia Vermoesen
 Pseudohamelia Wernham
 Pseudomantalania J.-F.Leroy
 Pseudomiltemia Borhidi
 Pseudomussaenda Wernham
 Pseudonesohedyotis TennantPseudopeponidium Arènes = Pyrostria Comm. ex A.Juss.
 Pseudopyxis Miq.Pseudosabicea N.Hallé = Sabicea Aubl.
 Pseudrachicallis H.Karst. = Arcytophyllum Willd. ex Schult. & Schult.f.Psilanthopsis A.Chev. = Coffea L.Psilanthus Hook.f. = Coffea L.Psilobium Jack = Acranthera Arn. ex Meisn.Psilostoma Klotzsch ex Eckl. & Zeyh. = Canthium Lam.
 Psychotria L.Psychotrion St.-Lag. = Psychotria L.Psychotrophum P.Browne = Psychotria L.
 Psydrax Gaertn.
 Psyllocarpus Mart. & Zucc.
 Pteridocalyx WernhamPterogaillonia Linchevskii = Plocama AitonPterostephus C.Presl. = Spermacoce L.
 Ptychodea Willd. ex Cham. & Schltdl. = Sipanea Aubl.Ptychostigma Hochst. = Galiniera Delile
 Pubeta L. = Duroia L.f.
 Pubistylus Thoth.
 Puffia Razafim. & B.BremerPutoria Pers. = Plocama Aiton
 Pygmaeothamnus RobynsPyragra Bremek. = Psychotria L.
 Pyrostria Comm. ex A.Juss.

 Q Quinquina Boehm. = Cinchona L.

 R 

 Rachicallis DC.
 Ramonadoxa Paudyal & Delprete
 Ramosmania Tirveng. & Verdc.Ramspekia Scop. = Posoqueria Aubl.
 Randia L.
 Raritebe WernhamRavnia Oerst. = Hillia Jacq.
 Razafimandimbisonia Kainul. & B.BremerReadea Gillespie = Eumachia DC.Relbunium (Endl.) Hook.f. = Galium L.
 Remijia DC.Renistipula Borhidi = Arachnothryx Planch.
 Rennellia Korth.Resinanthus (Borhidi) Borhidi = Stenostomum C.F.Gaertn.Restiaria Lour. = Uncaria Schreb.
 Retiniphyllum Humb. & Bonpl.Reussia Dennst. = Paederia L.Rhabdostigma Hook.f. = Kraussia Harv.
 Rhadinopus S.Moore
 Rhaphidura Bremek.Rhipidantha Bremek. = Pauridiantha Hook.f.
 Rhodopentas Kårehed & B.Bremer
 Rhodostoma Scheidw. = Palicourea Aubl.
 Rhombospora Korth. = Greenea Wight & Arn.Rhopalobrachium Schltr. & K.Krause = Cyclophyllum Hook.f.Rhyssocarpus Endl. = Melanopsidium Colla
 Richardia L.Richardsonia Kunth = Richardia L.
 Ridsdalea J.T.Pereira & K.M.Wong
 Riodocea Delprete
 Riqueuria Ruiz & Pav.
 Robbrechtia De Block
 Robynsia Hutch.
 Rogiera Planch.
 Roigella Borhidi & M.Fernandez Zeq.Rojoc Adans. = Morinda L.
 Ronabea Aubl.Ronabia St.-Lag. = Psychotria L.
 Rondeletia L.Rosea Klotzsch = Tricalysia A.Rich ex DC.
 Rosenbergiodendron Fagerl.
 Rotheria Meyen = Cruckshanksia Hook. & Arn.
 Rothmannia Thunb.
 Rovaeanthus Borhidi
 Rubeola Hill = Sherardia L.
 Rubia L.
 Rubioides Sol. ex Gaertn. = Opercularia Gaertn.
 Rubovietnamia Triveng.
 Rudgea Salisb.
 Rustia Klotzsch
 Rutidea DC.Rytidotus Hook.f. = Bobea Gaudich.
 Rytigynia Blume

 S 

 Sabicea Aubl.Sacconia Endl. = Chione DC.
 Sacosperma G.TaylorSahlbergia Neck. = Gardenia J.EllisSaldanha Vell. = Hillia Jacq.
 Saldinia A.Rich ex DC.
 Salzmannia DC.Samama Rumph. ex Kuntze = Breonia A.Rich ex DC.Santalina Baill. = Coptosperma Hook.f.Santia Wight & Arn. = Coptosperma Hook.f.
 Saprosma BlumeSarcocephalus Afzel. ex R.Br. = Nauclea L.Sarcopygme Setch. & Christoph. = Morinda L.Sardinia Vell. = Guettarda L.Sarissus Gaertn. = Hydrophylax L.f.
 Scandentia E.L.Cabral & Bacigalupo = Denscantia E.L.CabralScepseothamnus Cham. = Alibertia A.Rich ex DC.Schachtia H.Karst. = Duroia L.f.Schenckia K.Schum. = Deppea Schltdl. & Cham.Schetti Adans. = Ixora L.Schiedea Bartl. = Machaonia Humb. & Bonpl.
 Schismatoclada BakerSchizangium Bartl. ex DC. = Mitracarpus Zucc. ex Schult. & Schult.f.
 Schizenterospermum Homolle ex Arènes
 Schizocalyx Wedd.
 Schizocolea Bremek.
 Schizomussaenda H.L.LiSchizospermum Boivin ex Baill. = Cremaspora Benth.
 Schizostigma Arn. ex Meisn. = Sabicea Aubl.
 Schmidtottia Urb.
 Schoenleinia Klotzsch = Bathysa C.Presl
 Schradera Vahl
 Schreibersia Pohl = Augusta Pohl
 Schumanniophyton Harms
 Schwendenera K.Schum.Schwenkfelda Schreb. = Sabicea Aubl.Sclerococcus Bartl. = Hedyotis L.Scleromitrion (Wight & Arn.) Meisn.
 Scolosanthus Vahl
 Scyphiphora C.F.Gaertn.Scyphochlamys Balf.f. = Pyrostria Comm. ex A.Juss.
 Scyphostachys Thwaites
 Seemannia Hook. = Pentagonia Benth.
 Semaphyllanthe L.Andersson = Calycophyllum DC.
 Sericanthe Robbr.
 Serissa Comm. ex A.Juss.Sestinia Boiss. & Hohen. = Wendlandia Bartl. ex DC.
 Seychellea Razafim., Kainul. & Rydin
 Shaferocharis Urb.
 Sherardia L.
 Sherbournia G.DonSicelium P.Browne = Coccocypselum P.BrowneSickingia Willd. = Simira Aubl.Siderobombyx Bremek. = Xanthophytum Reinw. ex BlumeSiderodendrum Schreb. = Ixora L.Sideroxyloides Jacq. = Ixora L.
 Siemensia Urb.Silamnus Raf. = Cephalanthus L.
 Simira Aubl.
 Singaporandia K.M.WongSinoadina Ridsdale = Adina Salisb.
 Sipanea Aubl.
 Sipaneopsis Steyerm.
 Sipania Seem. = Limnosipanea Hook.f.Siphomeris Bojer = Paederia L.Siphonandra Turcz. = Arachnothryx Planch.
 Siphonandrium K.Schum.
 Siphonia Benth. = Augusta PohlSolena Lour. = Posoqueria Aubl.
 Solenandra Hook.f.Solenixora Baill. = Coffea L.
 Sommera Schltdl.Spallanzania DC. = Mussaenda L.Spathichlamys R.Parker = Greenea Wight & Arn.
 Spermacoce L.Spermacoceodes Kuntze = Spermacoce L.
 Spermadictyon Roxb.Sphaerophora Blume = Gynochthodes Blume
 Sphinctanthus Benth.
 Spicillaria A.Rich. = Hypobathrum BlumeSpiradiclis Blume = Ophiorrhiza L.
 Sprucea Benth. = Simira Aubl.
 Squamellaria Becc.
 Stachyarrhena Hook.f.Stachyococcus Standl. = Carapichea Aubl.
 Staelia Cham. & Schltdl.
 Standleya Brade
 Stannia H.Karst. = Posoqueria Aubl.Staurospermum Thonn. = Mitracarpus Zucc. ex Schult. & Schult.f.
 Steenisia Bakh.f.
 Stelechantha Bremek. = Pauridiantha Hook.f.Stellix Noronha = Psychotria L.Stelmanis Raf. = Oldenlandia L.Stelmotis Raf. = Oldenlandia L.
 Stenaria (Raf.) Terrell
 Stenosepala C.Perss.
 Stenostomum C.F.Gaertn.
 Stenotis Terrell
 Stephanium Schreb. = Palicourea Aubl.
 Stephanococcus Bremek.
 Stephegyne Korth. = Mitragyna Korth.Steudelago Kuntze = Exostema (Pers.) Rich. ex Humb. & Bonpl.
 Stevensia Poit.
 Steyermarkia Standl.
 Stichianthus ValetonStigmanthus Lour. = Gynochthodes Blume
 Stilpnophyllum Hook.f.
 Stipularia P.Beauv.Stomandra Standl. = Rustia KlotzschStraussia A.Gray = Psychotria L.
 Streblosa Korth.
 Streblosiopsis ValetonStrempelia A.Rich. ex DC. = Rudgea Salisb.Striolaria Ducke = Pentagonia Benth.
 Strumpfia Jacq.Sturmia C.F.Gaertn. = Stenostomum C.F.Gaertn.Stylocoryna Cav. = Aidia Lour.Stylocoryne Wight & Arn. = Aidia Lour.
 Stylosiphonia Brandegee
 Suberanthus Borhidi & M.Fernandez Zeq.Sukunia A.C.Sm. = Atractocarpus Schltr. & K.KrauseSulcanux Ridl. = Psychotria L.Sulipa Blanco = Gardenia J.EllisSulitia Merr. = Atractocarpus Schltr. & K.Krause
 Sulzeria Roem. & Schult. = Faramea Aubl.Suteria DC. = Psychotria L.Sykesia Arn. = Gaertnera Lam.Sylvainia M.F.Romero & R.M.SalasSymphyllarion Gagnep. = Hedyotis L.
 Synaptantha Hook.f.Synisoon Baill. = Retiniphyllum Humb. & Bonpl.
 Syringantha Standl.

 T Tainus  Torr.-Montúfar, H.Ochot. & BorschTamatavia Hook.f. = Chapelieria A.Rich ex DC.Tamilnadia Tirveng. & SastreTammsia H.Karst.Tamridaea Thulin & B.BremerTangaraca Adans. = Hamelia Jacq.Tangshuia S.S.YingTapanhuacanga Vell. ex Vand. = unplaced nameTapinopentas Bremek. = Otomeria Benth.Tapiphyllum Robyns = Vangueria Juss.Tapogomea Aubl. = Psychotria L.Tardavel Adans. = Spermacoce L.Tarenna Gaertn.Tarennoidea Tirveng. & SastreTatea Seem. = Thiollierea Montrouz.Teinosolen Hook.f. = Arcytophyllum Willd. ex Schult. & Schult.f.Temnocalyx RobynsTemnopteryx Hook.f.Tennantia Verdc.Tepesia C.F.Gaertn. = Hamelia Jacq.Terebraria Sessé ex Kuntze = Stenostomum C.F.Gaertn.Terrellianthus Borhidi = Arcytophyllum Willd. ex Schult. & Schult.f.Tertrea DC. = Machaonia Humb. & Bonpl.Tessiera Miq.Tetralopha Hook.f. = Gynochthodes BlumeTetramerium C.F.Gaertn. = Faramea Aubl.Tetraplasia Rehder = Damnacanthus C.F.Gaertn.Tetrastigma K.Schum. = Schumanniophyton HarmsThamnoldenlandia GroeninckxThecagonum Babu = Oldenlandia L.Thecorchus Bremek. = Oldenlandia L.Theligonum L.Theyodis A.Rich. = Oldenlandia L.Thieleodoxa Cham. = Alibertia A.Rich ex DC.
 Thiersia Baill. = Faramea Aubl.Thiollierea Montrouz.Thogsennia AielloThouarsiora Homolle ex Arènes = Ixora L.Thunbergia Montin = Gardenia J.EllisThyridocalyx Bremek. = Triainolepis Hook.f.Thysanospermum Champ. ex Benth. = Coptosapelta Korth.Timonius Rumph. ex DC.Tinadendron AchilleTobagoa Urb.Tocoyena Aubl.Tontanea Aubl. = Coccocypselum P.BrowneTortuella Urb.Tournefortiopsis Rusby = Guettarda L.Trailliaedoxa W.W.Sm. & ForrestTresanthera H.Karst. = Rustia KlotzschTrevirania Heynh. = Psychotria L.
 Triainolepis Hook.f.
 Tribrachya Korth. = Rennellia Korth.
 Tricalysia A.Rich ex DC.Trichogalium Fourr. = Galium L.
 Trichostachys Hook.f.
 Triflorensia S.T.ReynoldsTrigonopyren Bremek. = Psychotria L.Triodon DC. = Diodia L.Trisciadia Hook.f.Tromlyca BorhidiTrukia Kaneh. = Atractocarpus Schltr. & K.KrauseTsiangia But, H.H.Hsue & P.T.Li = Ixora L.Tulearia De Block

 U Ucriana Willd. = Tocoyena Aubl.
 Uncaria Schreb.Uncariopsis H.Karst. = Schradera VahlUragoga Baill. = Psychotria L.Urceolaria Willd. ex Cothen. = Schradera Vahl
 Urophyllum Jack ex Wall.Uruparia Raf. = Uncaria Schreb.

 V 

 Vaillantia Hoffm. = Valantia L.
 Valantia L.
 Vanessa Raf. = Manettia Mutis ex L.
 Vangueria Juss.
 Vangueriella Verdc.
 Vangueriopsis RobynsVarneria L. = Gardenia J.EllisVavanga Rohr = Vangueria Juss.Versteegia Valeton = Ixora L.Verulamia DC. ex Poir. = Pavetta L.
 Vidalasia Tirveng.Vignaldia A.Rich. = Pentas Benth.
 Villaria RolfeVirecta Afzel. ex SM. = Virectaria Bremek.Virecta L.f. = Sipanea Aubl.
 Virectaria Bremek.
 Viscoides Jacq. = Notopleura (Hook.f.) Bremek.Vissadali Adans. = Knoxia L.Viviania Colla = Melanopsidium CollaViviania Raf. = Guettarda L.
 Voigtia Klotzsch = Bathysa C.Presl

 W Wahlenbergia Blume = Tarenna Gaertn.
 Wallichia Reinw. ex Blume = Urophyllum Jack ex Wall.Wandersong David W.TaylorWarburgina Eig. = Callipeltis StevenWarneria J.Ellis = Gardenia J.Ellis
 Warszewiczia Klotzsch
 Watsonamra Kuntze = Pentagonia Benth.Webera Schreb. = Tarenna Gaertn.
 Wendlandia Bartl. ex DC.Wernhamia S.Moore = Simira Aubl.
 Wiegmannia Meyen = Kadua Cham. & Schltdl.
 Willdenovia J.F.Gmel. = Posoqueria Aubl.
 Williamsia Merr. = Praravinia Korth.
 Wittmackanthus Kuntze

 X Xanthophytopsis Pit. = Xanthophytum Reinw. ex BlumeXanthophytum Reinw. ex BlumeXantonnea Pierre ex Pit. = Discospermum DalzellXantonneopsis Pit.Xerococcus Oerst. = Hoffmannia Sw.Xeromphis Raf. = Catunaregam Wolf

 Y Yangapa Raf. = Gardenia J.EllisYutajea Steyerm. = Isertia Schreb.

 Z Zaluzania Raf. = Bertiera Aubl.Zamaria Raf. = Rondeletia L.
 Zeuxanthe Ridl. = Prismatomeris Thwaites
 Zuccarinia BlumeZwaardekronia Korth. = Chassalia Comm. ex Poir.Zygoon Hiern = Coptosperma'' Hook.f.

References 

 List of genera
Rubiaceae
Rubiaceae